, born , is the Chief Abbot of the Shōren-in Temple in Kyoto, Japan. He is also the Governor of Dai Nippon Butoku Kai and a cousin to the Emperor Akihito of Japan as well as the son of Higashifushimi Kunihide.

References

1942 births
Living people
Japanese priests